Acianthera aveniformis is a species of orchid.

References

aveniformis
Plants described in 1950